Ketchikan is a city in and the borough seat of the Ketchikan Gateway Borough of Alaska.  It is the state's southeasternmost major settlement. Downtown Ketchikan is a National Historic District.

With a population at the 2020 census of 8,192, up from 8,050 in 2010, it is the sixth-most populous city in the state, and thirteenth-most populous community when census-designated places are included. The surrounding borough, encompassing suburbs both north and south of the city along the Tongass Highway (most of which are commonly regarded as a part of Ketchikan, albeit not a part of the city itself), plus small rural settlements accessible mostly by water, registered a population of 13,948 in that same census.

Incorporated on August 25, 1900, Ketchikan is the earliest extant incorporated city in Alaska, because consolidation or unification elsewhere in Alaska resulted in the dissolution of those communities' city governments.  Ketchikan is located on Revillagigedo Island, so named in 1793 by Captain George Vancouver.

Ketchikan is named after Ketchikan Creek, which flows through the town, emptying into the Tongass Narrows a short distance southeast of its downtown. "Ketchikan" comes from the Tlingit name for the creek, the meaning of which is unclear. It may mean "the river belonging to Kitschk"; other accounts claim it means "Thundering Wings of an Eagle".

History

Ketchikan Creek served as a summer fish camp for Tlingit natives for untold years before the town was established by Mike Martin in 1885. He was sent to the area by an Oregon canning company to assess prospects. He established the saltery Clark & Martin and a general store with Nova Scotia native George Clark, who had been foreman at a cannery that burned down.

Ketchikan became known as "Alaska's first city" due to its strategic position at the southern tip of the Inside Passage, connecting the Gulf of Alaska to Puget Sound.

In 1905 a mission house was built, which in 1909 became the Yates Memorial Hospital. In 2020, the National Trust for Historic Preservation named the former hospital as one of America's most endangered historic places.

Totem poles

Ketchikan has the world's largest collection of standing totem poles, found throughout the city and at four major locations: Saxman Totem Park, Totem Bight State Park, Potlatch Park, and the Totem Heritage Center. Most of the totems at Saxman Totem Park and Totem Bight State Park are recarvings of older poles, a practice that began during the Roosevelt Administration through the Civilian Conservation Corps. The Totem Heritage Center displays preserved 19th-century poles rescued from abandoned village sites near Ketchikan.  The Chief Kyan pole in Whale Park in the city center is one of the featured background images in most US passports.

Geography

Ketchikan's GPS geographic coordinates are latitude 55.342 (slightly south of both Copenhagen, Denmark at 55.676 and Glasgow, Scotland at 55.864) and longitude -131.648. It is surrounded by the Tongass National Forest, which is managed by the United States Forest Service from its headquarters in the Ketchikan Federal Building downtown, and to the south by the Tongass Narrows, a narrow east-west saltwater channel, which is part of the Inside Passage.

Due to its steep and forested terrain, Ketchikan is long and narrow with much of the built-up area being located along, or no more than a few city blocks from, the waterfront. Deer Mountain, a  peak, rises immediately east of the city's downtown area.

The half-mile (800 m) wide channel called the Tongass Narrows separates Ketchikan from Gravina Island, where Ketchikan International Airport is located.

Climate
 
Ketchikan has a mild maritime or oceanic climate, characterized by heavy cloud cover and high humidity through much of the year and abundant rainfall throughout the year (even in the driest month), earning it the nickname of the "Rain Capital of Alaska". Ketchikan’s climate is classified as Köppen Cfb (“Marine West Coast”). On average, the growing season (non-freezing temperatures) lasts about 6.3 months or 191 days, extending from about April 19 to about October 27.

Ketchikan is the third-wettest city in the United States after Whittier and Yakutat.

Further east and away from moderating maritime influence, winters on these parallels in inland North America are much colder.

Demographics

Ketchikan first appeared on the 1890 U.S. Census as the unincorporated village of "Kichikan." Of its 40 residents, 26 were Native, nine were White and five were Creole (Mixed Russian & Native). It returned as Ketchikan beginning in 1900 and in every successive census. It incorporated as a city also in 1900.
 

, there were 8,050 people, 3,259 households, and 1,885 families residing in the city. As of 2017, The population density was 1,829.5 per square mile (714.1/km2). The racial makeup of the city was 60.7% White, 16.7% Native American (8.3% Tlingit-Haida, 1.9% Tsimshian), 10.8% Asian (9.4% Filipino), 10.0% from two or more races, 0.8% Black or African American, 0.3% Pacific Islander, and 0.7% some other race. 4.4% of the population were Hispanic or Latino (2.6% Mexican) of any race.

There were 3,259 households. 30.8% had children under the age of 18 living with them, 37.6% were headed by married couples living together, 13.7% had a female householder with no husband present, and 42.2% were non-families. 33.0% of all households were made up of individuals, and 9.0% were someone living alone who was 65 years of age or older. The average household size was 2.41, and the average family size was 3.07.

The population was spread by age ranges, with 23.9% under the age of 18, 9.5% from 18 to 24, 26.6% from 25 to 44, 29.3% from 45 to 64, and 10.7% who were 65 years of age or older. The median age was 36.7 years. For every 100 females, there were 103.1 males. For every 100 females age 18 and over, there were 102.5 males.

In 2017, the ACS-estimated median and average annual incomes for a household in the city were $56,372 and $70,490, respectively. The median and average incomes for a family were $68,438 and $84,518, respectively. The per capita income for the city was $30,474. About 12.4% of the population, including 19.8% of those under 18-years old, were below the poverty line. 90.0% spoke English, 5.98% Tagalog, 1.81% Spanish, and 0.7% Tsimshian as their first language.

Media

Ketchikan is home to four radio stations: KTKN-AM 930, KGTW-FM 106.7, KFMJ-FM 99.9, and community-owned NPR-affiliated KRBD-FM 105.3.

Ketchikan has one over-the-air broadcast television station, KUBD (TV), Channel 13 digital and 4 visual, a CBS network affiliate.

Ketchikan also houses the publishing offices of the Ketchikan Daily News.

The region has local cable television programming provided by Ketchikan Public Utilities, including public meetings, Southeast Alaska programming, Ketchikan High School sports and events, local history, gardening and scenes, and a calendar of upcoming local events; local television signals carried on the cable system are also translations of Seattle and Anchorage stations.

Government and infrastructure

The City of Ketchikan operates under a council-manager form of government. In 2018, Robert Sivertsen replaced Lew Williams III, who had served as mayor or councilmember for 28 years, as mayor of the City of Ketchikan. The current city mayor is Dave Kiffer who was elected in 2021. Rodney Dial is the current Mayor of the Ketchikan Gateway Borough, Alaska. The Alaska Marine Highway System has its headquarters in Ketchikan.

Ketchikan has long loomed heavy in Alaska's political landscape, though the increasing population in Southcentral Alaska has led to a diminishment of its influence since the 1980s. Following a round of redistricting, the convening of the 28th Alaska State Legislature in January 2013 marked the first time in the state's history that no residents of Ketchikan or the surrounding area serve as members of the Alaska Legislature.  Ketchikan is represented in the Alaska Senate by Bert Stedman, who lives in Sitka, and in the Alaska House of Representatives by independent Dan Ortiz, a former schoolteacher who taught at Ketchikan High School.

Over the decades, Ketchikan has produced a number of political figures of note to Alaska in general.  In territorial days, Norman Ray "Doc" Walker, a Canadian-born pharmacist practicing in Ketchikan, was arguably the first career member of the Alaska Legislature.  Walker served in the territorial Senate for 16 years before losing reelection in 1948 following a feud with territorial governor Ernest Gruening.  During the first governorship of Walter Hickel in the 1960s, two members of his cabinet (Frank Murkowski and Robert W. Ward) held strong ties to Ketchikan.  Following Hickel's resignation, Ward ascended to the office of secretary of state when Keith H. Miller became governor.  Ketchikan native Walter L. Kubley, deputy commissioner of commerce under Hickel, became commissioner of the department under Miller.  Another Ketchikan native, Terry Gardiner, was notable as the youngest person elected to the Alaska House of Representatives (at age 22), as well as the youngest person elected Speaker of the House (at age 28).

The United States Coast Guard maintains a large shore installation, Coast Guard Base Ketchikan, south of the downtown area, which serves as a homeport to three cutters and as a regional maintenance base for Alaska.

According to the U.S. Postal Service, one of Ketchikan's two zip codes, 99950, is the highest-numbered in the United States.

Economy and industries

A major and first port of entry into Alaska, Ketchikan's economy has been based on fishing industries, canneries in particular, tourism, government, and forestry. Average annual civilian employment in 2017 was 4,070, with a substantial seasonal work force peaking in July.

The area near the mouth of Ketchikan Creek earned Ketchikan a measure of infamy during the first half of the 20th century for a red-light district known as Creek Street, with brothels aligned on either side of the creek.

Ketchikan's economy is currently based upon government services, tourism and commercial fishing. Civic boosters have dubbed the community the "Salmon Capital of the World."

Ketchikan also receives a large number of tourists, both by air and sea, due to its popularity as a cruise ship stop. In 2018, Ketchikan Harbour saw 40 different cruise ships making more than 500 stops in the harbour and bringing more than 1,073,000 visitors to Ketchikan.

The Misty Fiords National Monument is one of the area's major attractions, and the Tongass National Forest has long been headquartered in Ketchikan, mostly in the city's historic Federal Building.  For most of the latter half of the 20th century, a large portion of Ketchikan's economy and life centered on the Ketchikan Pulp Company pulp mill in nearby Ward Cove. The mill closed in 1997 in the wake of the passage of the Tongass Timber Reform Act of 1990, which reduced timber harvest targets in the national forest.

Lumber
Ketchikan Pulp Company (KPC), a subsidiary of Louisiana-Pacific Corp., was headquartered just outside Ketchikan's city limits on the shores of Ward Cove.  The company's pulp mill opened in the cove in 1954.  A 1995 joint EPA and FBI investigation of the company revealed it had dumped contaminated wastewater and sludge in the waters around Ward Cove, leaving them classified as "impaired" by the EPA. KPC plead guilty to the charges and agreed to pay a $3 million fine.

In 1996, following the Clinton Administration's refusal to reinstate the original terms of KPC's timber contract, Louisiana-Pacific Corp. announced it would be shutting down the pulp mill, and did so in March 1997. A total of 514 direct year-round jobs and more than 500 indirect jobs were lost as a result.

Marine

The Ketchikan Shipyard consists of two dry-docks (10,000 ton and 2,500 ton) owned and operated by Alaska Ship & Drydock, a subsidiary of Vigor Industrial. It successfully launched the M/V Susitna in April 2010. A prototype ferry craft for use by Alaska's Matanuska-Susitna Borough, the Susitna is the result of planning by Admiral Jay M. Cohen, former chief of the Office of Naval Research, and former Navy captain Lew Madden, then working as a project manager for Lockheed Martin.

Dubbed E-Craft (for Expeditionary use), the Susitna will serve as the engineering and feasibility platform for a Navy vessel of approximately double the size to assist troops in landing at undeveloped beaches around the world.

The contract for two new Alaska-class day ferries in the Alaska Marine Highway was awarded to the shipyard on September 20, 2014,at a cost of $101 million.

Power and telecom 
Companies involved in power and telecommunications include Ketchikan Public Utilities (KPU), which is city-owned, as well as GCI and Alaska Power and Telephone Company (AP&T).

Transportation

Ketchikan serves as both an air and marine transportation hub for southern Southeast Alaska.

The Ketchikan International Airport serves as both a gateway for Alaska Airlines nonstop jet service to and from Seattle, Juneau, Sitka and Wrangell, with direct service to Anchorage, and as a bush carrier and charter aircraft hub for destinations such as Hyder, Metlakatla and Prince of Wales Island communities. Flying time to/from Seattle, Washington is approximately ninety minutes, making Ketchikan easily accessible to travelers from the continental U.S. Delta Air Lines began operating seasonal service to Seattle in May 2015.

Ketchikan receives service from two separate ferry lines. Ketchikan is a major port along the Alaska Marine Highway System's Inside Passage route. Vessels depart northbound to Alaskan ports of call and southbound to Prince Rupert, British Columbia, a six-hour trip, — where a connection can be made to the BC Ferries system — and Bellingham, Washington, a thirty-six-hour voyage. Sailings depart several times each week. Ketchikan also sees regular day service from the Alaska Marine Highway vessel M/V Lituya, a day boat that shuttles between its homeport in Metlakatla, AK and Ketchikan.

The Inter-Island Ferry Authority serves Ketchikan with daily service from its homeport in Hollis on Prince of Wales Island.

Education

Colleges and universities
The former Ketchikan Community College became the Ketchikan campus of the University of Alaska Southeast during the late 1980s restructuring of the University of Alaska System.  The campus is located on the uphill side of Ketchikan's West End neighborhood and consists of two buildings, the Paul Building and the Ziegler Building.  Both are named for prominent Ketchikan residents of the early and mid 20th century, William Lewis Paul and Adolph Holton Ziegler, respectively.

Public education
 Ketchikan Gateway Borough School District
 Ketchikan High School
 Revilla Junior/Senior High School
 Schoenbar Middle School

Health care
The city of Ketchikan and its surrounding areas are primarily served by the PeaceHealth Ketchikan Medical Center, which operates 24 hours a day, 7 days a week.

Sister cities and twin towns

 Palm Desert, California
 Kanayama, Gifu, Japan [former]

Ketchikan's former sister city of Kanayama, Gifu Prefecture, Japan, was incorporated along with four other cities into the larger city of Gero on March 1, 2004. An educational exchange program has been active between the two towns since 1986. Every year, Ketchikan and Kanayama exchange one teacher each to instruct middle-school level language classes in their respective tongues. In addition, Kanayama sends a group of students to Ketchikan during the spring, and students from Ketchikan travel to Kanayama the following summer. Ketchikan students travel across Japan, with the majority of their time spent in Kanayama with home-stay families, attending classes and touring the town.

Notable people
 Danny Edwards (born 1951), professional golfer
 Nathan Jackson (born 1938), Tlingit artist famous for his carving of totem poles
 Roy Jones (1893–1974), first person to fly commercially in Alaska
 Jerry Mackie (born 1962), Alaska state legislator and businessman, born in Ketchikan
Tallie Medel, actress
 Frank Murkowski (born 1933), former United States Senator and Governor of Alaska; Murkowski grew up in Ketchikan, where his father was vice-president of the First National Bank of Ketchikan, which exists today as a Southeast regional bank called First Bank
 Lisa Murkowski (born 1957), second daughter of Frank Murkowski and his successor as U.S. Senator, born in Ketchikan
 Rudy Pankow (born 1998), American actor
 William Paul (1885–1977), (Shgúndi), Tlingit statesman and leader in the Alaska Native Brotherhood born near Ketchikan. Paul was the first Alaska Native to become an attorney and first elected to the Alaska Territorial legislature
 Ray Troll (born 1954), artist famous for blending art and science in his fish-laden drawings
 Don Watts (born 1956 or 1957), farmer and entrepreneur

In popular culture 
Several movies have been shot in Ketchikan, including The Silver Horde, Spawn of the North, Timber Tramps and Cry Vengeance, plus episodes of the television programs The Love Boat and Baywatch. An episode of Mythbusters where the team sees if a ship made out of ice and sawdust can really float was filmed in Ketchikan in 2009. The National Geographic Channel series Alaska Wing Men in the episode "Fatal Crash" follows a National Transportation Safety Board investigator's site visit of a July 2010 bush pilot fatal crash near Ketchikan.

In The Young Pope TV series, the character Pope Pius XIII as a punishment sends several cardinals who upset him to Ketchikan, which is depicted as a frozen wasteland.

In Arthur Miller's play Death of a Salesman, Uncle Ben must leave Willy to go to Ketchikan, where he presumably made part of his fortune.

See also
 National Register of Historic Places listings in Ketchikan Gateway Borough, Alaska
 Seathwaite, Allerdale, wettest settlement in the United Kingdom

References

External links

 
 Ketchikan Visitor's Bureau
 
 Catching a Can in Ketchikan, A History of the Canned Salmon Capital of the World, by Dave Kiffer
 

 
borough seats in Alaska
cities in Alaska
cities in Ketchikan Gateway Borough, Alaska
micropolitan areas of Alaska
populated coastal places in Alaska on the Pacific Ocean
populated places established in 1885